Loïs Lane is a Dutch girl group consisting of the sisters Suzanne and Monique Klemann. The band was named after Superman's girlfriend, Lois Lane, from DC Comics. In the U.S. they are known as Lois L.

Biography
The group was founded in 1984 by Monique Klemann; however, her background singer Angela left the group in 1985 and was replaced by her sister Suzanne Klemann. The sisters are of Indo (Eurasian) descent.

In 1987, they participated in the Grote Prijs van Nederland, the most important amateur musician contest, and were offered a record deal by Warner Music Group. In 1988, they recorded the title song "Amsterdamned" for the movie of the same name, which resulted in their first moderate success; however, the record label dropped them and they started their own imprint, Lana Lane.

After this first exposure, they recorded their debut album Loïs Lane which peaked at No. 1, after their second single "It's The First Time" became a summer hit. This song came to the attention of Prince who became interested in the sisters.

In 1990, they joined Prince as the support act for some of the shows of his Nude Tour. In 1992, they recorded a new album Precious together with Prince, and recorded the two singles "Sex" and "Qualified". In 1997, they wrote the title song for the television program Combat, and also wrote the title song for an Emmy Awarded television program, Dunya and Desi, in 2003. They had some moderate success with their album, Covers, which featured cover versions.

In 2004, the sisters decided to pose for Playboy, partially as a joke.

In October 2013, they released their new album, As One, which spawned the singles "The Morning Patrol" and "You and You and Me".

Solo career of Monique Klemann

Monique started to embark on her solo career first as "Strapless In Soho", however she has released her debut solo album, On Patrol, in September 2006 under her own name. On Patrol was recorded because Monique played the leading role in the television series, Parels & Zwijnen, in which she sang jazz covers and thought that the songs deserved to be released as well. The album peaked at No. 35 in the Dutch Albums Chart.

Discography

Albums

Singles

References

External links
 Official website of Loïs Lane

Dutch dance music groups
Dutch girl groups
Sibling musical duos
Indo people
Musical groups established in 1984
Dutch musical duos
Female musical duos